Xieyi is an atonal pinyin romanization of various Chinese words.

It may refer to:

 xièyī (t 褻衣, s 亵衣), a form of lingerie in ancient China
 xiěyì (t 寫意, s 写意), a form of traditional Chinese painting
 Xieyi, an album by a Swedish musician